Michael Polywka (6 January 1944 – 12 January 2009) was a German footballer who played as a midfielder.

Career
Polywka started his senior career at SC Motor Jena (renamed into FC Carl Zeiss Jena in 1966) in East Germany. He defected from his team after an away game in the 1966–67 Intertoto Cup against AIK in Sweden to join West German Bundesliga side Eintracht Braunschweig.

Following a one-year suspension by FIFA, Polywka made his debut in the Bundesliga on 19 August 1967, in a game against 1860 Munich. In total, he played five seasons in the Bundesliga for Braunschweig and Hannover 96. In 1972, he joined Austrian club FC Admira/Wacker Vienna.

References

External links

1944 births
2009 deaths
People from the Province of Upper Silesia
Sportspeople from Gliwice
German footballers
East German footballers
Association football midfielders
East Germany under-21 international footballers
DDR-Oberliga players
Bundesliga players
Austrian Football Bundesliga players
Eintracht Braunschweig players
Hannover 96 players
FC Carl Zeiss Jena players
FC Admira Wacker Mödling players
German expatriate footballers
German expatriate sportspeople in Austria
Expatriate footballers in Austria